Brad Alan Grey (December 29, 1957 – May 14, 2017) was an American television and film producer. He co-founded Brillstein-Grey Entertainment (now Brillstein Entertainment Partners), and afterwards became the chairman and CEO of Paramount Pictures, a position he held from 2005 until 2017. Grey graduated from the State University of New York at Buffalo School of Management. Under Grey's leadership, Paramount finished No. 1 in global market share in 2011 and No. 2 domestically in 2008, 2009, and 2010, despite releasing significantly fewer films than its competitors. He also  produced eight out of Paramount's 10 top-grossing pictures of all time after having succeeded Sherry Lansing in 2005.

Early life
Grey was born to a Jewish family in the Bronx, the youngest child of a garment district salesman. He majored in business and communications at the University at Buffalo.  

While attending the university, he became a gofer for a young Harvey Weinstein, who was then a concert promoter. The first show Grey produced (at age 20) was a concert by Frank Sinatra at Buffalo's Buffalo Memorial Auditorium in 1978. He traveled to Manhattan on weekends to look for young comics at The Improv. Grey brought comedian Bob Saget to New York, thus making Saget his first client.

Career

Talent agent and producer
In 1984, Grey met talent manager Bernie Brillstein in San Francisco, California at a television convention. Having convinced Brillstein that he could deliver fresh talent, he was taken on as a partner and the Bernie Brillstein Company was re-christened Brillstein-Grey Entertainment. Grey began producing for television in 1986 with the Showtime hit, It's Garry Shandling's Show. In the late 1990s, Shandling sued Grey for breach of duties and related claims. Shandling complained that his TV show lost its best writers and producers when Brad Grey got them deals to do other projects, and that Grey commissioned these other deals, while Shandling did not benefit from them. Grey denied the allegations and countersued, saying the comedian breached his contract on The Larry Sanders Show by failing to produce some episodes and indiscriminately dismissing writers, among other actions. Both suits were settled avoiding a trial. Shandling did testify about Grey during the 2008 trial of private investigator Anthony Pellicano who worked on Grey's defense team. The value of the settlement to Shandling was later disputed by attorneys as being either $4 million or $10 million.

In 1996, Brillstein sold his shares of the Brillstein-Grey company to Grey, giving Grey full rein over operations; the company's television unit was subsequently rechristened "Brad Grey Television". Grey produced shows such as Emmy Award-winning The Sopranos and The Wayne Brady Show. Other shows developed in the 1990s under the Brillstein-Grey banner included Good Sports, The Larry Sanders Show, Mr. Show, Real Time with Bill Maher, The Sopranos, NewsRadio, and Just Shoot Me! Grey also ventured into film by producing the Adam Sandler hit Happy Gilmore.

In 1996, actress Linda Doucett alleged that Grey and Shandling fired her from The Larry Sanders Show after her personal relationship with Shandling ended. Doucett reportedly received a $1 million settlement in this matter in 1997.

In July 2000 - on the day of Scary Movies opening - Grey and Brillstein-Grey were sued by Bo Zenga and his Boz Productions in what became known as the 'Scary' suit. Zenga, at the time an unknown bit-part actor, "claimed he had an oral agreement with Grey's management firm Brillstein-Grey Entertainment, giving him equal profits on the film". Scary Movie went on to make $278m worldwide.

The pre-trial discovery process "revealed that major parts of Zenga's resume were fabricated. Brillstein-Grey said in a court filing that Zenga presented himself as a successful investment banker who became a prize-winning screenwriter to satisfy his creative urges." "Far from being a successful investment banker, Zenga once filed for personal bankruptcy" and "according to court papers, the only writing award he won was in a phony contest he set up himself." After denying under oath that he knew who owned the company that ran the contest, Bo Zenga recanted a day later, admitting his ownership of the company and "saying he had been 'overmedicated.'" When questioned about "an accusation from his former business partner that he coerced her to lie for him," Zenga "in a highly unusual move for a plaintiff in a film-profits case — asserted his Fifth Amendment right not to answer hundreds of questions." Zenga's suit was thrown out of court for lack of evidence. L.A. Superior Court Judge Robert O'Brien "noted it was only the second time in all his years on the bench that he had granted a non-suit and taken a case away from a jury."

In 2002, Grey formed Plan B with Brad Pitt and Jennifer Aniston, with a first-look deal at Warner Bros. The company produced two films for Warner Bros: Tim Burton's Charlie and the Chocolate Factory with Johnny Depp, and Martin Scorsese's The Departed, starring Leonardo DiCaprio, Matt Damon, and Jack Nicholson. After Pitt and Aniston separated, Grey and Pitt moved the company to Paramount Pictures in 2005.

In May 2006, Zenga "filed a new suit against Grey personally," in which he charged Grey with using notorious private investigator Anthony Pellicano to illegally wiretap and conduct illegal background checks on Zenga during the original case. Grey denied any knowledge, testifying that "his dealings with Pellicano 'all came through Bert Fields' and that 'in every instance' Grey had never been given updates on the investigations by Pellicano." The suit was "dismissed, due to Zenga having lied and to statute of limitations issues." Zenga's appeal continued after Grey's death until being dismissed in December 2017.

Paramount Pictures CEO
Grey was named chief executive officer of Paramount Pictures Corporation in 2005.  In his position, Grey was responsible for overseeing all feature film development and production for films distributed by Paramount Pictures Corporation including Paramount Pictures, Paramount Vantage, Paramount Classics, Paramount Insurge, MTV Films and Nickelodeon Movies. He was also responsible for the worldwide business operations for Paramount Pictures International, Paramount Famous Productions, Paramount Home Media Distribution, Paramount Animation, Studio Group and Worldwide Television Distribution.

Among the commercial and critical hit films Paramount produced and/or distributed during Grey's tenure were the Transformers, Paranormal Activity, and Iron Man franchises, Star Trek, How to Train Your Dragon, Shrek the Third, Mission: Impossible III, Mission: Impossible – Ghost Protocol, An Inconvenient Truth, There Will Be Blood, No Country for Old Men, The Curious Case of Benjamin Button, Babel, Shutter Island, Up in the Air, The Fighter, True Grit, The Adventures of Tintin: The Secret of the Unicorn, and Hugo.

During his time as chairman and CEO of Paramount, the studio's films were nominated for dozens of Academy Awards, including 20 in 2011 and 18 in 2012.

After arriving at Paramount in 2005, Chairman and CEO Grey was credited with leading a return to fortune at the box office. He oversaw the creation and revitalization of several major franchises, Transformers: Revenge of the Fallen, Star Trek, and Paranormal Activity, which was made for $15,000 and generated $192 million at the global box office. Paranormal Activity 2 grossed $177 million worldwide, and the third installment in the franchise collected $205.7 million worldwide in 2011. A fourth installment was released in October 2012. The studio's 2011 results included Transformers: Dark of the Moon, which grossed more than $1.1 billion worldwide, and Mission: Impossible – Ghost Protocol, whose $694 million global box office tally makes it the most successful entry in that franchise. Paramount's 2012 slate included The Dictator which earned $179 million on a $65 million budget.

During this period, Paramount forged productive relationships with top-tier filmmakers and talent including J. J. Abrams, Michael Bay and Martin Scorsese.

In 2011, based on the success of Rango, the studio's first original, computer-animated release, Grey oversaw the launch of a new animation division, Paramount Animation.

The 2010 Paramount slate achieved much success with Shutter Island and True Grit reaching the biggest box office totals in the storied careers of Martin Scorsese and the Coen brothers, respectively. In addition, during Grey's tenure, Paramount launched its own worldwide releasing arm, Paramount Pictures International, and has released acclaimed films such as An Inconvenient Truth, Up in the Air and There Will Be Blood. The success of Paranormal Activity also led to the creation of a low-budget releasing label Insurge Pictures, which released Justin Bieber: Never Say Never, which collected nearly $100 million in worldwide box office revenue.

Grey was ousted from Paramount Pictures shortly before his death, a result of a power struggle between his backers and the family of majority owner Sumner Redstone, along with a series of flops that cost the studio $450 million in losses.

Death
Grey died on May 14, 2017 from cancer at his Holmby Hills home in Los Angeles, California. He was 59.

Philanthropy
Grey received an honorary Doctor of Humane Letters degree from SUNY during a visit to Buffalo and UB in 2003. Grey's Board appointments included:
 UCLA's Executive Board for the Medical Sciences
 USC School of Cinema-Television Board of Councilors
 Board of Directors for Project A.L.S.
 NYU's Tisch School of the Arts
 Los Angeles County Museum of Art

Filmography
He was a producer in all films unless otherwise noted.

Film

As writer

Miscellaneous crew

Thanks

Television

Awards

References

External links
 

1957 births
2017 deaths
Film producers from New York (state)
American film studio executives
Television producers from New York City
Primetime Emmy Award winners
People from the Bronx
American talent agents
University at Buffalo alumni
20th-century American Jews
Businesspeople from New York City
Deaths from cancer in California
Paramount Pictures executives
People from Holmby Hills, Los Angeles
20th-century American businesspeople
21st-century American Jews